Globuloviridae is a family of hyperthermophilic archaeal viruses. Crenarchaea of the genera Pyrobaculum and Thermoproteus serve as natural hosts. There are four species in this family, assigned to a single genus, Alphaglobulovirus.

Taxonomy
The family contains one genus which contains four species:
 Alphaglobulovirus
 Alphaglobulovirus PSV
 Alphaglobulovirus PSV1
 Alphaglobulovirus TSPV1
 Alphaglobulovirus TTSV1

Structure
Virions in the Globuloviridae are spherical and enveloped. The diameter is around 100 nm.

Genomes are linear dsDNA and non-segmented, around 20–30kb in length.

Life cycle
Viral replication is cytoplasmic. DNA-templated transcription is the method of transcription. Pyrobaculum and Thermoproteus archaea serve as the natural host. Transmission routes are passive diffusion.

References

External links
 ICTV Report: Globuloviridae
 Viralzone: Globuloviridae

 
Archaeal viruses
Virus families